Lake Palatinus is the biggest lake of Esztergom, Hungary. 

It is a mine lake. The deepest point is 12 meters.

References 

 A website about Lake Palatinus (Hungarian)
 Palatinus-tó at Benedek Endre Barlangkutató és Természetvédelmi Egyesület (Hungarian)

Palatinus
Esztergom
Geography of Komárom-Esztergom County